The Sony Zeiss Vario-Tessar T* FE 16-35mm F4 ZA OSS is a constant maximum aperture wide-angle full-frame (FE) zoom lens for the Sony E-mount, announced by Sony on September 15, 2014.

Though designed for Sony's full frame E-mount cameras, the lens can be used on Sony's APS-C E-mount camera bodies, with an equivalent full-frame field-of-view of 24–52.5mm.

Build quality
The lens has a weather resistant solid all-metal finish  with a pair of metal focus and zoom rings. The barrel of the lens telescopes outward from the main lens body as it's zoomed in from 16mm to 35mm.

See also
List of Sony E-mount lenses
Sony FE 16-35mm F2.8 GM
Sony FE 12-24mm F4 G
Zeiss Vario-Tessar

References

Camera lenses introduced in 2014
16-35
16-35